Dimitrios Zouliotis (born 12 June 1984) is a Greek footballer.

Career
Born in Kalyvia, Agrinio, Zouliotis began his professional career with local side Panetolikos in July 2001.

References

External links

1984 births
Living people
Greek footballers
Association football midfielders
Aiolikos F.C. players
Panetolikos F.C. players
Ethnikos Asteras F.C. players
Korinthos F.C. players
Footballers from Agrinio